Northfield is a city in Dakota and Rice counties in the State of Minnesota. It is mostly in Rice County, with a small portion in Dakota County. The population was 20,790 at the 2020 census.

History

Northfield was platted in 1856 by John W. North. Local legend says that the town was named for John North and a Mr. Field. North, realizing that the town straddled the proposed northern border of Rice county, went to the state capital to lobby to move the border one mile north. Northfield was founded by settlers from New England known as "Yankees" as part of New England's colonization of what was then the far west. It was an early agricultural center with many wheat and corn farms. The town also supported lumber and flour mills powered by the Cannon River. As the "wheat frontier" moved west, dairy operations and diversified farms replaced wheat-based agriculture. The region has since moved away from dairy and beef operations. Today it produces substantial crops of corn and soybeans, as well as hogs. The local cereal producer Malt-O-Meal is one of the few remnants of Northfield's historic wheat boom. The city's motto, "Cows, Colleges, and Contentment", reflects the influence of the dairy farms as well as its two liberal arts colleges, Carleton College and St. Olaf College.

Since early in its history, Northfield has been a center of higher education. Carleton College (then Northfield College) was founded in 1866 by the Minnesota Conference of Congregational churches whose Congregation consisted of the "Yankee" settlers who had largely founded the town. These were people descended from the English Puritans who settled New England in the 1600s. Carleton soon established its campus on the northern edge of town. St. Olaf College was founded in 1874 on the western edge of town by Norwegian Lutheran immigrant pastors and farmers who were eager to preserve their faith and culture by training teachers and preachers. These two institutions, which today enroll more than 5,000 students, make Northfield a college town.

In the 1970s, completion of Interstate 35 six miles west of Northfield enabled the expansion of the Minneapolis–Saint Paul metro area south of the Minnesota River. The downtown grain elevator accepted its last load of corn in 2000 and was torn down in 2002. Residential growth has been rapid since the mid-1990s. Northfield Hospital, which opened in 2003 in the town's northwest corner, is in Dakota County, so chosen because government reimbursement rates are more generous for Dakota County than for Rice County.

Geography
The peak elevation is about 912 feet.

The town is roughly centered around the Cannon River and rises to the east and west from it.

Minnesota State Highways 3, 19, and 246 are three of Northfield's main routes.

Demographics

2010 census
As of the census of 2010, there were 20,007 people, 6,272 households, and 3,946 families living in the city. The racial makeup of the city was 88.8% White, 1.3% African American, 0.2% Native American, 3.5% Asian, 4.0% from other races, and 2.2% from two or more races. Hispanic or Latino of any race were 8.4% of the population.

There were 6,272 households, of which 32.8% had children under the age of 18 living with them, 50.0% were married couples living together, 9.3% had a female householder with no husband present, 3.6% had a male householder with no wife present, and 37.1% were non-families. 30.7% of all households were made up of individuals, and 13.1% had someone living alone who was 65 years of age or older. The average household size was 2.44 and the average family size was 3.04.

The median age in the city was 26.4 years. 19.8% of residents were under the age of 18; 29% were between the ages of 18 and 24; 19.1% were from 25 to 44; 20.1% were from 45 to 64; and 12% were 65 years of age or older. The gender makeup of the city was 47.4% male and 52.6% female.

2000 census
As of the census of 2000, there were 17,147 people, 4,909 households, and 3,210 families living in the city. The racial makeup of the city was 92.57% White, 0.90% African American, 0.34% Native American, 2.36% Asian, 0.05% Pacific Islander, 1.78% from other races, and 1.99% from two or more races. Hispanic or Latino of any race were 5.73% of the population.

There were 4,909 households, out of which 35.4% had children under the age of 18 living with them, 52.7% were married couples living together, 9.6% had a female householder with no husband present, and 34.6% were non-families. 27.5% of all households were made up of individuals, and 9.6% had someone living alone who was 65 years of age or older. The average household size was 2.53 and the average family size was 3.08.

In the city, the population was spread out, with 20.2% under the age of 18, 32.1% from 18 to 24 (a figure heavily influenced by the student population of St. Olaf and Carleton College), 21.0% from 25 to 44, 16.1% from 45 to 64, and 10.5% who were 65 years of age or older. The median age was 23 years. For every 100 females, there were 91.3 males. For every 100 females age 18 and over, there were 87.7 males.

The median income for a household in the city was $49,972, and the median income for a family was $61,055. Males had a median income of $40,008 versus $28,456 for females. The per capita income for the city was $18,619. About 2.8% of families and 7.2% of the population were below the poverty line, including 5.3% of those under age 18 and 7.4% of those age 65 or over.

Economy

Early in the city's history, local merchants created a small town square between Fourth Street to the north, Division Street to the east, the Cannon River to the west, and the southern storefronts. The old Ames Mill/Malt-O-Meal plant was also nearby, originally powered by the dam on the river. Bridge Square and the surrounding downtown area remain a strong cultural attraction for the city. The square has several amenities including a large fountain, a memorial statue, and a concession stand known as "the popcorn wagon" run by the senior center. Several scenic walkways follow the river, and numerous shops and boutiques can be found on the neighboring streets.

Businesses serving the growing senior citizen community of Northfield have expanded to include the Northfield Senior Center,  the Village on the Cannon, Millstream Commons, and new construction at the Northfield Retirement Center complex. The northern edge of the city has also been expanding with several residential and commercial developments.

Jesse James' and the James-Younger Gang's 1876 attempt to rob the First National Bank of Northfield serves as a heritage tourism draw for the town. The original bank building was converted to a museum operated by the Northfield Historical Society. The First National Bank of Northfield operates from a main office built half a block away from the historic site. In its front lobby, a glass case showcases a gun used during the robbery.

The Northfield Convention and Visitors Bureau provides comprehensive tourism information and visit planning services.

Arts and culture

Defeat of Jesse James Days Celebration

On September 7, 1876, Northfield experienced one of its most important historical events, when The James-Younger Gang attempted a robbery on the First National Bank of Northfield. Local citizens, recognizing what was happening, armed themselves and resisted the robbers and successfully thwarted the theft. The gang killed the bank's cashier, Joseph Lee Heywood and a Swedish immigrant, Nicholas Gustafson. A couple of members of the gang were killed in the street, while Cole, Bob and Jim Younger were cornered near Madelia, Minnesota. Jesse and Frank James escaped west into the Dakota Territory, while the remaining gang members were killed or taken into custody.  Considering the James gang as related to postwar insurgency, the raid has sometimes been called the last major event of the American Civil War. Two of Northfield's slogans are "Jesse James Slipped Here", based on the raid's failure, along with “Get your guns boys, they’re robbing the bank!”

The events have become the basis of an annual outdoor heritage festival called The Defeat of Jesse James Days. It is held the weekend after Labor Day and is among the largest outdoor celebrations in Minnesota. Thousands of visitors witness reenactments of the robbery, which is staged on Division street, outside of the First National Bank of Northfield. Other activities during the festival include: a championship rodeo, carnival, car show, and parade, as well as arts and crafts expositions, and musical performances. Many food stations are set up in Bridge Square, and during the evenings live music is played in a "beer tent" on Water Street. A horseshoe hunt takes place the week prior to the celebration; an antique horseshoe is hidden somewhere within the city on public grounds and the finder claims that year's cash purse.

In popular media
 Films based on the failed raid include The True Story of Jesse James (1957), The Great Northfield Minnesota Raid (1972), and The Long Riders (1980).
 Northfield was also the setting of the TV-movie Love Always, Santa (2016).

Parks and recreation
Three of these parks have picnic shelters.

The Carleton College Cowling Arboretum is a well-established arboretum and nature preserve of  adjacent to and owned by Carleton College. It offers extensive trails for walking in the summer and cross-country skiing in the winter.

St. Olaf College also owns many hundreds of acres called the St. Olaf Natural Lands. These include  of natural habitat and  acres of agricultural land. The St. Olaf Natural Lands are open to the public all year long.

The Mill Towns State Trail was built in 1998 as a joint effort of the cities of Northfield and Dundas.

Government and politics
The City of Northfield has a mayor-council government. The City Administrator is responsible for managing daily operations. The current mayor is Rhonda Pownell. The city council consists of six members, four of whom represent city districts and two of whom are at-large members serving four year terms.

Northfield is served by Minnesota State Senator Rich Draheim (R) in District 20 and State Representative Todd Lippert (DFL) in District 20B.

In the United States Congress, Northfield is part of Minnesota's 2nd congressional district, represented by Angie Craig (DFL) since 2019, and in the Senate by Tina Smith and Amy Klobuchar, both members of Minnesota's Democratic-Farmer-Labor Party, an affiliate of the Democratic Party.

Education
Northfield is home to St. Olaf and Carleton colleges. Their student and staff populations account for a large portion of the town's year-round population.

The Northfield Public School district operates three elementary schools, a middle school, a high school, and an alternative learning center. In addition, Northfield has public charter schools: Arcadia (grades 6–12) and Prairie Creek Community School (grades K–5) in nearby Castle Rock. They receive state funding from the State of Minnesota.

Transportation
Northfield is at the intersection of Minnesota State Highway 3 and Minnesota State Highway 19. The nearest interstate highway is I-35, west of the city. Northfield is also the site of one of the first roundabouts with grade-separated paths for bikes and pedestrians in the United States at the intersection of TH 246 and Jefferson Parkway.

Historically, Northfield was served by four railroads: the Chicago Great Western Railway, Milwaukee Road, the Rock Island, and the Minneapolis, Northfield and Southern Railway. Today, the freight-only Albert Lea Subdivision of the Union Pacific Railroad runs north-south through Northfield. Progressive Rail, a short-line railroad, operates several branch lines radiating from Northfield. Resumption of passenger service over the Dan Patch Corridor has been studied.

Notable people
 Peter Agre (born January 30, 1949), Nobel laureate in chemistry
 Adelbert Ames (October 31, 1835 – April 13, 1933), Union Army general during the Civil War and Mississippi politician during Reconstruction; father Jesse Ames purchased the Ames Mill, producers of Malt-O-Meal, in 1865
 Cyril Archibald (1837 – April 13, 1914), member of Canadian Parliament
 Ian Barbour (October 5, 1923 – December 24, 2013), winner of 1999 Templeton Prize
 Steven Brust (born November 23, 1955), author and musician
 Lincoln Child (born 1957), author
 F. Melius Christiansen (April 1, 1871 – June 1, 1955), pioneer of a cappella choral music
 Raymond Cox (1951-2017), Minnesota state legislator and businessman
 Michael Dorris (January 30, 1945 – April 10, 1997), author
 Joan N. Ericksen (born 1954), United States District Court judge
 Steve Grove (born 1978), American businessman, former Google News Lab Director and Commissioner of Minnesota Department of Employment and Economic Development
 Ralph B. Goodhue (January 27, 1878 - January 18, 1960), Minnesota state senator and farmer
 Laurence McKinley Gould (August 22, 1896 – June 21, 1995), geologist, educator, polar explorer
 Joel Heatwole (August 22, 1856 – April 4, 1910), U.S. Representative
 Lucius Roy Holbrook (April 30, 1875 – October 19, 1952), U.S. Army major general
 Alexandra Holden (born April 30, 1977), actress
 Siri Hustvedt (born February 19, 1955), author, poet, and essayist
 Justin Kloos, NHL player for the Anaheim Ducks
 Thomas M. Neuville (January 31, 1950 – January 26, 2022), Minnesota state senator and judge
 Grace Fallow Norton (October 29, 1876 – 1962), poet
 Karl Rolvaag (July 18, 1913 – December 20, 1990), governor of Minnesota
 Ole Edvart Rølvaag (April 22, 1876 – November 5, 1931), author
 Gilmore Schjeldahl (June 1, 1912 – March 10, 2002), inventor and entrepreneur
 Peter Schjeldahl (born March 20, 1942), art critic and writer
 Marilyn Sellars (born 1944), country music singer
 Chad Setterstrom (born June 13, 1980), professional football player
 Mark Setterstrom (born March 3, 1984), professional football player
 Edward Sovik (June 9, 1918 – May 4, 2014), architect, liturgist
 Steve Strachan (born January 26, 1965), former member of the Minnesota House of Representatives, former sheriff of King County, Washington
 Edward John Thye (April 26, 1896 – August 28, 1969), governor of Minnesota and U.S. Senator
 Thorstein Veblen (July 30, 1857 – August 3, 1929), economist and sociologist
 Paul Wellstone (July 21, 1944 – October 25, 2002), U.S. Senator
 Jon Wee (born 1965?), professional juggler
 Johnny Western (born October 28, 1934), singer-songwriter, actor, radio host
 Charles Augustus Wheaton (July 1, 1809, - March 14, 1882), major figure in the abolitionist movement and Underground Railroad
 Ida Belle Clary Wilcox (August 6, 1850 – January 26, 1928), missionary honored by South Africa in 2009
 Jerome J. Workman Jr. (born on August 6, 1952), American spectroscopist, editor, author

Media

Radio

References

External links

 City of Northfield, MN – Official site
 Northfield.org
 Northfield Convention and Visitors Bureau – Visitor Information

 
Cities in Minnesota
Cities in Dakota County, Minnesota
Cities in Rice County, Minnesota
James–Younger Gang